King's Baptist Grammar School is in Wynn Vale, a north eastern suburb of Adelaide, South Australia, having moved from nearby Tea Tree Gully where it was known as Tea Tree Gully Christian School. The school is also recognized for its annual musical production, held at the Shedley Theater in Elizabeth. In 2013, 950 students were enrolled at the school.

History 
Construction of the Wynn Vale site began in November 1988, as part of the Golden Grove development. On 7 February 1989, King's opened on its Wynn Vale Campus with 300 students. The oval and library are shared with the government Keithcot Farm Primary School.

The school's most recent addition was a new science and performing arts building (completed at the end of 2004) including four specialist laboratories, four instrumental teaching rooms, a keyboard lab, and amphitheatre, as well as an extension to the Design and Technology building, dedicated to CAD.

Facilities
The school's arts programs is a popular extra-curricular activity amongst students. The school has competed in the Rock Eisteddfod Challenge until 2003, after which it began producing and performing its own musical productions.

In 2011, the school completed construction on a new gym. This facility contains two basketball courts, two classrooms, a weights room, change rooms and plenty of storage space. In the same year, the school also completed construction on a library upgrade, pulling the once outdated building into a 21st century building. The new library contains ample space for students to read and work, as well as computers, tablets and laptops.

Notable alumni
 Daniel Menzel: Australian rules footballer with the Geelong Football Club
 Troy Menzel: Australian rules footballer with the Adelaide Football Club
 Guy Sebastian: Australian Idol winner

References

External links
School website

Private schools in South Australia
Baptist schools in Australia
1989 establishments in Australia
Educational institutions established in 1989